2017 Kamatamare Sanuki season.

J2 League

References

External links
 J.League official site

Kamatamare Sanuki
Kamatamare Sanuki seasons